CNX may refer to:

IATA code of Chiang Mai International Airport, Thailand
CNX (TV channel), a defunct television channel operating in Britain from 2002 to 2003
CNX Resources, natural gas company formerly part of Consol Energy
OpenStax CNX, an educational content repository based at Rice University
Middle Cornish, ISO 639-3 language code cnx
Vagus nerve, the tenth cranial nerve, abbreviated CN X